Little Sister was an American all-female vocal harmony group, which served primarily as the background vocalists for the influential rock/funk band Sly and the Family Stone in concert and on record. Originally a gospel music group called The Heavenly Tones, Little Sister was composed of Vet Stewart (Family Stone frontman Sly Stone's little sister), Mary McCreary, and Elva Mouton, and became a recording act of its own for a brief period in 1970–1971.

History

Formation
While still in high school, Vaetta Stewart and her friends Mary McCreary, Elva Mouton and Tramaine Hawkins had a gospel group called The Heavenly Tones and performed at various venues around the Oakland/San Francisco area. In 1966 they recorded the album "I Love The Lord" for the Gospel label, and a 45 for the Music City label called "He's Alright" When Vaetta's older brother Sylvester aka Sly Stone formed Sly and the Family Stone with their brother Freddie, and friends Larry Graham, Cynthia Robinson, Jerry Martini, and Greg Errico, the Heavenly Tones were recruited directly out of high school to become Little Sister, Sly & the Family Stone's background vocalists for their recording. Tramaine Hawkins left the group and started a very successful solo career.

Hit singles
During the interim period between the releases of the Family Stone albums Stand! and There's a Riot Goin' On, Sly Stone negotiated a production deal with Atlantic Records, resulting in his own imprint, Stone Flower. Stone Flower released four singles, including one by R&B artist Joe Hicks, one by 6IX, and two by Little Sister: "You're The One" and "Somebody's Watching You", a cover of a song from Stand!.

Both Little Sister 45s reached the Billboard Hot 100 Top 40 and the Billboard R&B Top 10:

 "You're the One", part 1/"You're The One, part 2" made it to No. 4 R&B and No. 22 pop (2/28/70)
 "Somebody's Watching You"/"Stanga" made it to No. 8 R&B and No. 32 pop (11/28/70)

Eventually, Sly ceased production of further Little Sister recordings, and Little Sister were relegated to background vocal work for the rest of its existence. Atlantic flipped the 2nd single over and reserviced it and it charted, as well;

 "Stanga"/"Somebody's Watching You" made it to No. 44 R&B but did not chart again on the pop chart (2/19/72).

Later period
During the post-1971 period of Sly & the Family Stone, Mary McCreary left the group and began a solo career. She married singer-songwriter Leon Russell and, with him, recorded Wedding Album in 1976 and Make Love to the Music in 1977. She was replaced by Lucy Hambrick. Little Sister continued to provide background vocals and perform live with Sly & The Family Stone. Little Sister was dissolved when the Family Stone did, in 1975, after the band's fortunes slowly fell due to Sly Stone's drug abuse problems.

Members
 Vet Stewart
 Elva "Tiny" Mouton
 Mary McCreary (replaced in 1972 by Lucy Hambrick)

Discography

Albums
 1966: "I Love The Lord" (Gospel) (The Heavenly Tones)

Singles
 1966: "He's Alright" b/w "Precious Lord" (Music City) (The Heavenly Tones)
 1970: "You're The One [Part 1]" b/w "You're The One [Part 2]" (Stoneflower) (US No. 22, R&B #4)
 1970: "Somebody's Watching You" b/w "Stanga" (Stoneflower) (US No. 32, R&B #8)
 1972: "Stanga" b/w "Stanga" (radio promo release only) (Stoneflower) (US No. 44 R&B)

External links
 [ Little Sister] at Allmusic.
 Sly Lil Sis website
 

American soul musical groups
American funk musical groups
Sly and the Family Stone members
American girl groups